John Gray (born December 28, 1951) is an American relationship counselor, lecturer and author. In 1969, he began a nine-year association with Maharishi Mahesh Yogi before beginning his career as an author and personal relationship counselor. In 1992 he published the book Men Are from Mars, Women Are from Venus, which became a long-term best seller and formed the central theme of all his subsequent books and career activities. His books have sold millions of copies.

Early life and education
Gray was born in Houston, Texas, in 1951 to a father who was an oil executive and a mother who worked at a spiritual bookshop, and grew up with five brothers. His parents were both Christians and taught him Yoga and took him to visit Indian Saint Yogananda during his childhood. The Autobiography of A Yogi inspired him greatly later in life.

He received a bachelor's and master's degree in the Science of Creative Intelligence, though sources vary on whether these degrees were received from either the non-accredited Maharishi European Research University (MERU) in Switzerland or the accredited Maharishi International University in Fairfield, Iowa.

Gray received an unaccredited (but state-approved) PhD in 1982 from Columbia Pacific University (CPU), a now-defunct institution located in San Rafael, California, upon completion of a correspondence course and an honorary doctorate from Governors State University in Illinois after he delivered their commencement address in 2002.

Career
In 1969, Gray attended a Transcendental Meditation lecture, later becoming a celibate and personal assistant to Maharishi Mahesh Yogi for nine years.

Gray writes a USA-syndicated column with 30 million readers that appears in The Atlanta Journal-Constitution, New York Daily News, New York Newsday, The Denver Post, and the San Antonio Express-News. Internationally, Gray's columns have appeared in publications in England, Canada, Mexico, Korea, Latin American and the South Pacific.

Gray is a family therapist and a member of the American Counseling Association and the International Association of Marriage and Family Counselors.

Publication
In 1992, Gray published his book, Men Are from Mars, Women Are from Venus, which has sold more than 15 million copies and, according to a CNN report, it was the "highest ranked work of non-fiction" of the 1990s. The book became a "popular paradigm" for problems in relationships based on the different tendencies in each gender and led to infomercials, audiotapes and videotapes, a CD-ROM (the first from HarperReference), weekend seminars, theme vacations, a one-man Broadway show, a TV sitcom plus a movie contract with 20th Century Fox. The book has been published in 40 languages and has earned Gray almost $18 million.

Other ventures
In 1996, Gray and Maia and Bart Berens co-founded Mars Venus Institute. Bart Berens was president and Maia Berens was director.

In 1997, Gray began opening Mars & Venus Counseling Centers, where he trains therapists in his "Mars & Venus technique" in exchange for a one-time licensing fee and monthly "royalty payments". Dorothy Cantor, a former president of the American Psychological Association, has questioned the ethics of creating a franchise for what is essentially a therapeutic process.

In 1997, Gray began marketing his products through Genesis Intermedia, a company led by Ramy El-Batrawi. According to their SEC filing, "A substantial portion of our product revenue has come from our Men Are From Mars, Women Are From Venus product series authored by John Gray, Ph.D."  On December 31, 1997, Genesis sold 116,504 shares of its common stock to Dr. John Gray for $900,000. On November 1, 1998, 29,126 of those shares were surrendered. Royalties paid to Dr. Gray for the years ended December 31, 1998, 1997 and 1996 were $0, $50,101, and $423,207, respectively. There were no royalties paid to Dr. Gray during the three months ended March 31, 1999 and 1998. in 2004, a massive class action lawsuit was filed against Genesis Intermedia for stock price manipulation. El-Batrawi settled with the SEC and was barred from acting as an officer or director of a public company for a period of five years.

Gray has been marketing dietary supplements through his Web site since at least 2005. In 2019, the U.S. Food and Drug Administration ordered him to stop making illegal claims for several products: 2-AEP Membrane Complex, Ionic Silver Water, L-Glutathione, Liposomal DHA – Ultimate Omega-3 Brain Support, Liposomal Methyl B12/Folate, NAC N-Acetyl-L-Cysteine, and Vectomega.

Gray is also an early investor in YayYo, Inc, a rental car business for the ride-sharing industry operated by Ramy El-Batrawi. Gray owns 21.44% through his Gray Mars Venus Trust.

Interviews and appearances
Gray has made numerous media appearances including Oprah, The Phil Donahue Show, and Larry King Live. Gray has been profiled in Newsweek, People and Forbes magazine.

In a June 2014 interview with Agence France-Presse, Gray was quoted as saying with regard to feminism, "The reason why there's so much divorce is that feminism promotes independence in women. I'm very happy for women to find greater independence, but when you go too far in that direction, then who's at home?" He also stated that "feminism in America holds back sales of [his] books", while other parts of the world - he cited Australia and Latin America notably - are more in tune with his basic message. With regard to online pornography Gray stated, "With free internet porn, there's a massive addiction happening," adding that there are "just millions and millions of people... experiencing their sexual satisfactions through total fantasy. The effect that porn has on the brain is like taking heroin." With regard to the rise of infidelity sites like Ashley Madison and Arrangement Finders he states, "When you have impersonal sex.... 'It's OK, here are these cheating wives, men, they want to have sex with you'... So you go have sex with someone that you don't know and someone you don't love... impersonal sex does promote addiction to sex," he adds, "it's along the same line of pornography."

Criticism
In 2002, author Julia T. Wood published a critical response to Gray's portrayals of men and women in his book Men Are from Mars, Women Are from Venus. In 2007 Deborah Cameron published a book-length critique of Gray and other self-help ventures premised on gender difference stereotypes in The Myth of Mars and Venus: Do Men and Women Really Speak Different Languages?

Gray was accused of borrowing from the work of author Deborah Tannen and he acknowledges some similarities but says, "I was teaching those ideas before I'd heard of her" and that he did not read her book. Other critics have accused Gray of limiting human psychology to stereotypes.

Personal life
Gray married self-help author Barbara De Angelis and they divorced in 1984, after which he re-evaluated his ideas about relationships. Gray married his second wife, Bonnie, in 1986; she died of cancer in 2018.

Gray has a daughter and two stepdaughters. His youngest daughter Lauren markets the Mars Venus brand through her own videos on self-help relationship advice.

Books and other publications
 1992: Men Are from Mars, Women Are from Venus
 1993: What You Feel You Can Heal
 1994: What Your Mother Couldn't Tell You & Your Father Didn't Know
 1994: Mars and Venus in Love
 1995: Mars and Venus in the Bedroom
 1997: Mars and Venus on a Date
 1997: Mars and Venus Starting Over
 1999: How To Get What You Want and Want What You Have
 2000: Children Are from Heaven
 2000: Mars and Venus: 365 Ways to Keep Passion Alive
 Men, Women and Relationships
 Mars and Venus Together Forever: A Practical Guide to Creating Lasting Intimacy
 Men Are from Mars, Women Are from Venus Book of Days
 Practical Miracles for Mars and Venus: Nine Principles for Lasting Love, Increasing Success, and Vibrant Health in the Twenty-first Century
 2002: Mars and Venus in the Workplace, 
 Truly Mars & Venus
 2003: The Mars & Venus Diet & Exercise Solution
 2007: Why Mars and Venus Collide: Improving Relationships by Understanding How Men and Women Cope Differently with Stress
 2010: Venus on Fire, Mars on Ice – Hormonal Balance – The Key to Life, Love, and Energy
 75 Ways To Say I Love You (co-author Darren Stephens),  
 How To Release Stress Through Relaxation (co-author Darren Stephens), 
 Work with Me: The 8 Blind Spots Between Men and Women in Business (co-author Barbara Annis), 
 2017: Beyond Mars and Venus

See also
 Essentialism
 Symposium (Plato)#Aristophanes

References

Further reading

External links
 John Gray's Bio at official website
 John Gray, Columbia Pacific University, alumni recognition 
 Summary of Children Are from Heaven
 

1951 births
American self-help writers
Living people
Writers from Houston
Popular psychology
Writers from Texas
Columbia Pacific University alumni
Relationship education
Male critics of feminism